Northridge Mall was a shopping mall located in the northern part of Milwaukee, Wisconsin that first opened in August 1972. It was developed by Taubman Centers. The mall's original anchor stores were JCPenney, Sears, Boston Store, and Gimbels. Gimbels was sold to Marshall Field's, then H. C. Prange Co., and finally Younkers. The mall underwent a period of decline and was shuttered in 2003.

History

Opening and initial success 
The Grand Opening occurred in August 1972, two years after its sister mall, Southridge Mall opened in 1970. Both were financed and owned by Senator Herb Kohl and part of the Taubman Centers. Northridge Mall was co-developed with the nearby Northridge Lakes development, a residential development consisting of a mix of inventive multi-family residences, in concert with a planned northern beltline freeway which would have connected the area to the rest of the Milwaukee area. The pioneering mall was planned and designed as a regional center, consisting of a two level mall with four anchors: J. C. Penney, Sears, Boston Store, and Gimbels, along with a United Artists Theatres triplex (eventually expanded to six screens). Marshall Field's came to the mall in 1987, as part of their acquisition of 5 former Gimbels stores. Marshall Field's sold their store to H. C. Prange Co. in 1988, which in turn became Younkers in 1992. Younkers closed in 1999.

In 1992, Jesse Anderson stabbed his wife to death in the parking lot of a TGI Friday's near the mall, claiming two African-American men had attacked the couple and stabbed his wife to death; it was later revealed he fabricated a false alibi. He and Jeffrey Dahmer were both killed by Christopher Scarver in the Columbia Correctional Institution in 1994.

The mall declined within the decade after, as the freeway revolts of the 1970s ended up cancelling the north freeway intended to complete the Milwaukee beltline, leaving those intending to go to Northridge on miles of the surface street Brown Deer Road from Interstate 43 and U.S. 41/45 to access the mall; other closer shopping options had been developed in the ensuing decades along the completed freeways in formerly rural areas, and the Brown Deer strip in each direction from the mall had developed a number of disparate and cluttered retail developments with very little continuity or theming. Crime around the general area also increased to a smaller extent, but alarmism of those crimes in what was a suburban area in the local media, along with the lingering effects of the Anderson case despite its resolution, decreased the mall's clientele, as suburban shoppers chose other options with easy freeway access such as Mayfair, Brookfield Square, and newly developed power center shopping options in Mequon, Menomonee Falls, and Grafton. The final blow to the mall was the early 2000s recession, which saw a number of tenants pull out after their lease expirations and the mall's owner unable to find new ones outside of local small businesses. The mall eventually closed in 2003.

The Northridge Lakes development also ran into complexities involving the local real estate market, which preferred single-family detached homes over apartment developments, forcing its ownership to lower their rents and take in a more traditional apartment clientele than the high-end market it intended to market to.

Revitalization attempts
The former Sears store was then the razed, and a Menards home improvement store and Pick 'n Save supermarket occupied the site. Also, a Value City furniture store moved into a portion of the old Boston Store building but closed in May 2009. The rest of the mall remains vacant.

As of August 2013, William Penzey of Penzeys Spices had announced plans to purchase the mall for use in Penzeys Spices operations. In April 2014, the Chinese investment company which purchased the mall, U.S. Black Spruce Enterprise Group, retained ownership by making a last minute payment halting a foreclosure auction that might have allowed Penzeys Spices to take ownership of the property. That ownership has alleged plans for a large-scale Asian marketplace mall and office complex, but outside of generic architectural renderings of the concept, no plans or permit approvals have been advanced to Milwaukee's city council, and the city has been purposefully obstructed from overall communication by Black Spruce, outside of refusals to cooperate with any alternate plans for the building and payments to avoid the city taking eminent domain over the property. The proposal is also improperly marketed for the metro's population, whose majority Asian population is Hmong Americans and Indian Americans.

In September 2014, Pick n Save announced it would be closing its store at Northridge Mall. After the Pick n Save closed, only a Menards store remained at the site.

The mall has been used for airsoft events since its abandonment. Many of these events have featured popular Airsoft players such as Airsoft Alfonse In 2018, the mall was rented out to MIR Tactical, an airsoft store and event promoter, to host an airsoft game called the "Milwaukee Offensive".

On April 11, 2019, the City of Milwaukee issued a demolition order for the mall. On the evening of July 22, 2019, a maintenance contractor was fatally electrocuted while investigating an open fuse box at the mall.

The demolition order was approved by a judge of the Milwaukee County Circuit Court on May 13, who ruled that the mall was dangerous. City officials have claimed that Black Spruce pays owed back taxes only when the city begins to take action against Black Spruce.

In the summer of 2022, a rash of four arson fires occurred around the mall, with Black Spruce only securing holes in the roof with common drywall, a situation that has Aaron Lipski, Milwaukee's fire chief, fearing for the lives of his firefighters, as the mall has no working fire suppression or prevention systems, and the building's breadth requires all battalions on the city's northwest side to respond, putting the rest of the community at risk. Following the fires, Milwaukee County Judge William Sosnay found Black Spruce in contempt of court and ordered Black Spruce to secure the property or face a fine of $2,000 a day. As of September 2, 2022, Black Spruce faces at least $26,000 in fines.

References

Shopping malls in Wisconsin
Economy of Milwaukee
Articles containing potentially dated statements from 2010
All articles containing potentially dated statements
Shopping malls established in 1972
1972 establishments in Wisconsin
2003 disestablishments in Wisconsin
Defunct shopping malls in the United States
Shopping malls disestablished in 2003
North Side, Milwaukee